The 1995 All-Pacific-10 Conference football team consisted of American football players chosen by various organizations for All-Pacific-10 Conference teams for the 1995 Pacific-10 Conference football season.

Seven of the conference's teams had at least three players represented on the All-Pac 10 first team as follows:
 Conference co-champion USC was ranked No. 12 in the final AP Poll and placed four players on the first team: wide receiver and Pac-10 Offensive Player of the Year Keyshawn Johnson, offensive lineman John Michels, defensive lineman Darrell Russell, and punter John Stonehouse.
 Conference co-champion Washington placed three on the first team: tight end Ernie Conwell, linebacker Ink Aleaga, and defensive back Lawyer Milloy.
 Oregon was ranked No. 18 in the final AP Poll and placed three on the first team: running back and Pac-10 all-purpose player of the year Ricky Whittle, linebacker Jeremy Asher, and defensive back Alex Molden.
 Fourth-place Stanford placed three on the first team: offensive lineman Jeff Buckley, placekicker Eric Abrams, and return specialist Damon Dunn.
 UCLA, tied for fifth place, placed three on the first team: running back Abdul-Karim al-Jabbar and offensive lineman Jonathan Ogden and Mike Flanagan.
 Arizona, also tied for fifth place, placed three, all defenders, on the first team: Pac-10 Defensive Player of the Year Tedy Bruschi, defensive lineman Chuck Osborne, and defensive back Brandon Sanders.
 Arizona State placed three, all on offense, on the first team: quarterback Jake Plummer, wide receive Keith Poole, and offensive lineman Juan Roque.

Offensive selections

Quarterbacks
 Jake Plummer, Arizona State (AP-1)

Running backs
 Abdul-Karim al-Jabbar, UCLA (AP-1)
 Ricky Whittle, Oregon (AP-1)

Wide receivers
 Keyshawn Johnson, USC (AP-1)
 Keith Poole, Arizona State (AP-1)

Tight ends
 Ernie Conwell, Washington (Coaches-1)

Offensive linemen
 Jonathan Ogden, UCLA (AP-1)
 Jeff Buckley, Stanford (AP-1)
 Mike Flanagan, UCLA (AP-1)
 John Michels, USC (AP-1)
 Juan Roque, Arizona State (AP-1)

Defensive selections

Defensive linemen
 Tedy Bruschi, Arizona (AP-1)
 Regan Upshaw, California (AP-1)
 Chuck Osborne, Arizona (AP-1)
 Darrell Russell, USC (AP-1)

Linebackers
 Jeremy Asher, Oregon (AP-1)
 Ink Aleaga, Washington (AP-1)
 Duane Clemons, California (AP-1)

Defensive backs
 Lawyer Milloy, Washington (AP-1)
 Brandon Sanders, Arizona (AP-1)
 Alex Molden, Oregon (AP-1)
 Reggie Tongue, Oregon State (AP-1)

Special teams

Placekickers
 Eric Abrams, Stanford (AP-1)

Punters
 John Stonehouse, USC (AP-1)

Return specialists 
 Damon Dunn, Stanford (AP-1)

All purpose
Ricky Whittle, Oregon (AP-1)

Miscellaneous
 Offensive Player of the Year: Keyshawn Johnson (AP)
 Defensive Player of the Year: Tedy Bruschi (AP)

Key
AP = Associated Press

See also
1995 College Football All-America Team

References

All-Pacific-10 Conference Football Team
All-Pac-12 Conference football teams